Daniel Gibson is an American politician. He is a member of the South Carolina House of Representatives from the 12th District. He is a member of the Republican party.

Early life and career

Gibson was born in Anderson, South Carolina. He graduated from Forrest College, a community college in Anderson. He worked as a career pilot.

Political career

In the 2022 general election, Gibson unseated Democratic incumbent Anne Parks, who held the office since 1999. He received 52.9% of the total vote. He assumed office on December 6, 2022.

Gibson serves on the House Interstate Cooperation and the Agriculture, Natural Resources and Environmental Affairs Committees.

References

Republican Party members of the South Carolina House of Representatives
Living people
Year of birth missing (living people)